Chicken Creek is a stream in Berkeley County, South Carolina, in the United States.

Chicken Creek was named for the Chicken family who settled there.

See also
List of rivers of South Carolina

References

Rivers of Berkeley County, South Carolina
Rivers of South Carolina